The University of Georgia Computer Science Major is under The UGA School of Computing, formerly known as the Computer Science Department. It is jointly administered by the Franklin College of Arts and Sciences and College of Engineering after a proposal to elevate the department into its own school due to rapid growth in the major at the University of Georgia. While the original Computer Science department was established in 1984, the All-New School of Computing was established on July 1, 2022.

2014–2016 growth
Computer Science is, as of September 2016, the third-most enrolled major at the University of Georgia and is the university's fastest growing major. The number of undergraduates enrolled as Computer Science majors increased from 614 in fall 2014 to 751 in fall 2015 (an increase of 22%). In 2016, the Computer Science department was able to hire more faculty to keep up with its own growth and the national need for IT and programming related skills. This hiring process was primarily sparked by a student petition, which amassed over 1000 signatures, to the Computer Science department head and the dean of the Franklin College of Arts and Sciences. The petition requested more funding and instructors for the department. Computer Science is also the 3rd highest paying major at UGA, with each student making a $59,800 starting salary and a $102,000 mid career salary on average.

Student Involvement and Achievement
Being the 3rd most enrolled major at the University of Georgia, the Computer Science department has a plethora of student groups and organizations.

Hackathons
In 2015, the University of Georgia's first hackathon was organized by a student organization, led by an undergraduate Jaicob Stewart, known as UGAHacks, which is now officially endorsed by Major League Hacking. The first edition was co-run by Paul Hwang (who designed all of the digital art for the event) and Anurag Banerjee (who led technical infrastructure and sponsorship). Since the first edition, the event has grown in terms of attendees, organizers, and a plethora of companies have sponsored the event over the years as a way to interact and potentially recruit skillful computer science and engineering students. On February 7–9, 2020, the fifth edition of the event (UGAHacks 5) will take place at the Zell B. Miller Learning Center.

Association for Computational Machinery
The University of Georgia of has an Association for Computing Machinery branch that operates at the school. The University also has a branch of ACM-W, which focuses on empowering collegiate women in computer science.

Small Satellite Research Laboratory
The UGA Small Satellite Research Laboratory was founded in 2016 by Caleb Adams, an undergraduate computer science student, and involves around 20 students. This organization will be building the university's first satellite, which will deployed in late 2018 from the International Space Station.

References

External links
 

University of Georgia
Colleges and schools of the University of Georgia
Athens, Georgia
1984 establishments in Georgia (U.S. state)
Educational institutions established in 1984